Ivan Megharoopan is a 2012 Malayalam biographical film written and directed by P. Balachandran. The film is based on the life of Malayalam poet P. Kunhiraman Nair and is particularly based on his autobiography, Kaviyude Kalpadukal. Prakash Bare, who is the producer of the film, also plays the protagonist K. P. Madhavan Nair.

Cast
 Prakash Bare as K. P. Madhavan Nair
 Padmapriya as Ammini
 Shweta Menon as Maya Maheswari
 Remya Nambeesan as Rajalekshmi
 Jayapriya Sadanandan as Saraswathi Amma
 Anumol as Thankamani
 Jagathy Sreekumar as Appu Marar
 Chembil Ashokan as Aanapachan Aashan
 Kannur Sreelatha as Padmavathi
 V. K. Sreeraman as Kallattil Padmanabha Kurup
 Sunitha Nedungadi as Chinnammalu
 Surabhi Lakshmi as Kousalya
 Ambika Mohan as Madhavi
 Sajitha Madathil as Gomathi Teacher
Thambi Antony as Swami

Production

Development
Ivan Megharoopan  is P. Balachandran's debut film as a director. He has earlier written certain notable scripts including Ulladakkam, Pavithram and Punaradhivasam. Balachandran had discussed the story with filmmaker V. K. Prakash after writing Punradhivasam (which won the National Film Award for Best Feature Film in Malayalam in 2000) for him. He suggested Prakash to direct the film but somehow the project didn't take off. In 2008, Balachandran decided to make the film on the poet, himself. "When I spoke to Prakash of my plans, he encouraged me to direct the film. And that is how Ivan Megharoopan was born. The film is not a biography of Kunhiraman Nair, It is based on the life and the soul of the great poet," Balachandran says. He adds he was fascinated by the life of Kunhiraman Nair long before he wanted to make a film on it.

"It was direction that I learnt at the School of Drama in Thrissur, so I am not surprised that I have become a director. I have sometimes felt that I could have contributed a lot more to Malayalam cinema. Not that I am complaining; if I didn't do more it was because I didn't try hard," Balachandran says.

Kaviyude Kalpadukal, the autobiography of Kunhiraman Nair, is one of the foundations for the film, the director says. "But the film is not based only on that book. Ivan Megharoopan is a fictionalised version of the life of the poet," he clarifies.

Casting
The audition for the casting was held at Kochi in October. The protagonist of the film is K. P. Madhavan Nair, a character which obviously reflects P. Kunhiraman Nair. Prakash Bare, who played the lead role in the award-winning feature Sufi Paranja Katha, was chosen to play Madhavan Nair. Bare also produced the film under the banner of Silicon Media. Padmapriya and Anu play the leading ladies while a few new faces play the other important female roles. Jagathy Sreekumar and Chembil Ashokan also act in notable roles.

O. N. V. Kurup and Kavalam Narayana Panicker have written the lyrics, which have been tuned by Sharreth. "No, I won't be using any of the poems of Kunhiraman Nair, but music will be important for the film," says Balachandran. Actress Remya Nambeeshan has sung a track in the film. A folk song titled "Aande Londe" is sung by the actress, who was trained in Carnatic vocal singing during her childhood days. The song is penned by Kavalam and is said to have prime importance in the film.

Filming
The filming, planned to begin on 5 November 2010, was started a week later only. Major parts were shot from Ottapalam.

Release and reception
Film released on 27 July 2012 with critics giving a positive review. Paresh C. Palicha of Rediff.com rated the film  and stated that the film has soul. Sify.com gave the verdict as "good" and said that the film "succeeds in taking the viewer along with the narrative and the intriguing life of the poet has been presented in an attractive style." Veeyen of Nowrunning.com also gave a  rating and said that, the film "is full of life, and the vivaciousness that pervades the narrative lets the dazzling sparkle on this character study remain right on place." The Times of India rated the film  and stated that the film "is a moving, poignant account of a poet's life that gains a lot from a carefully chosen cast."  Theater Balcony gave a  rating and wrote: "This one is one of the best from 2012 and cannot be missed for its feel, daring narration and the splendid performances. Surly Ivan Megharoopan will haunt us for long time."

Soundtrack
The songs in the film are written by ONV Kurup and Kavalam Narayana Panikkar. It also includes a poem by "Mahakavi" P. Kunhiraman Nair, on whose life the film is based on. Ivan Megharoopan original sound track was the first Malayalam release of Universal Music Group.

Awards
 Kerala State Film Awards (2011)
 Second Best Film
 Best Music Director (song): Sharreth
 Best Editor: Vinod Sukumaran
 Best Dubbing Artist (Female):  Praveena

 14th John Abraham Awards
 Special Jury Award

 Radio Mirchi Awards
 Best Songs
 Best Singer - KS Chithra

References

External links

2012 films
2010s Malayalam-language films
Indian biographical films
Films based on biographies
Films scored by Sharreth
Biographical films about writers
Works about poets
Films shot in Ottapalam
Films shot in Palakkad
Films shot in Kerala
Films set in Kerala
2010s biographical films